The Snowy River National Park is a national park located in the Alpine and East Gippsland regions of Victoria, Australia.

On 7 November 2008, the park was added to the Australian National Heritage List as one of eleven areas constituting the Australian Alps National Parks and Reserves.

History 
Some aboriginal relics were discovered on the Snowy River which indicated that the Kruatungulung group of the Kurnai Aborigines used to hunt here. It was in the 1840s that cattlemen and miners visited the region and started using the higher land for summer grazing and introduced silver mining. The proposal for the national park was submitted in 1935, but the establishment took place in 1979.

Location and features

The park provides one of the last natural habitats at the Little River Gorge for the endangered brush-tailed rock wallaby. Numbers for this species are estimated as extremely small, with the rugged terrain making it difficult to accurately monitor the species population. Over 250 native species have been recorded in the park, 29 of which are considered rare or threatened in Victoria, including the long-footed potoroo, spotted quoll (tiger quoll), giant burrowing frog and Cyclodomorphus michaeli.

McKillops Road is the northern park boundary, with the Alpine National Park to the north of the road. The road is designated unsuitable for caravans, trailers and semi-trailers due to its long, narrow, and steep descent down to McKillops Bridge which crosses the Snowy River near its juncture with the Deddick River. A camping site near McKillops Bridge provides an excellent site for swimming, launching canoes and rafting through the rugged gorges downstream, or the start for the 18 km Silver Mine Walking Track and the short Snowy River Trail. The park is also located adjacent to the Errinundra National Park, the Coopracambra National Park, and the nearby Croajingolong National Park and Cape Conran Coastal Park.

See also

 Australian Alps National Parks and Reserves
 Protected areas of Victoria (Australia)
 Snowy Mountains Scheme

References

External links

National parks of Victoria (Australia)
East Gippsland
Protected areas established in 1979
Australian National Heritage List
1979 establishments in Australia
Australian Alps National Parks and Reserves
Snowy River
Southeast Australia temperate forests